"No Time" is a single by UK artist Just Jack which was recorded in 2006. It reached 32 in the UK Singles Chart in April 2007.

The music video is about a television presenter and his job on a TV Show.

Two Versions 
There are two versions to the song. The album version, and the single version, which is more electronic.

Track listings
CD single
 "No Time"
 "No Time" (Wideboys Remix)

External links
 
 

2007 singles
Just Jack songs
2007 songs
Mercury Records singles